Harmonstown railway station, is a DART stop, serving the locality of Harmonstown and the nearer parts of Artane and Raheny in Dublin, Ireland.

Facilities
The small station, which has no parking, is located on the rail bridge between Harmonstown Road and the Ennafort / Cill Eanna part of Raheny, and the platforms are below in a cutting.

History
The station opened on 27 January 1957.

See also
 List of railway stations in Ireland

References

External links
 Irish Rail Harmonstown Station website
 Eiretrains - Harmonstown Station

Iarnród Éireann stations in Dublin (city)
Railway stations opened in 1957
Raheny
Artane, Dublin
1957 establishments in Ireland
Railway stations in the Republic of Ireland opened in the 20th century